AM or Am may refer to:

Arts and entertainment

Music
 A minor, a minor scale in music
 A.M. (Chris Young album)
 A.M. (Wilco album)
 AM (Abraham Mateo album) 
 AM (Arctic Monkeys album)
 AM (musician), American musician
 Am, the A minor chord symbol
 Armeemarschsammlung (Army March Collection), catalog of German military march music
 Andrew Moore (musician), Canadian musician known as A.M.
 DJ AM, American DJ and producer
 Skengdo & AM, British hip hop duo

Television and radio
 AM (Australian radio series)
 American Morning, American morning television news program
 Am, Antes del Mediodía, Argentine current affairs television program
 Am, a character in the anthology Star Wars: Visions

Other media 
 Allied Mastercomputer, the antagonist of the short story "I Have No Mouth, and I Must Scream"

Education
 Active Minds, a mental health awareness charity
 Arts et Métiers ParisTech, a French engineering school
 Australian Museum, a museum in Australia
 Master of Arts, an academic degree

Military 
 AM, the United States Navy hull classification symbol for "minesweeper"
 Air marshal, a senior air officer rank used in Commonwealth countries
 Anti-materiel rifle, rifle designed for use against military equipment
 Aviation structural mechanic, a U.S. Navy occupational rating

Science
 AM, a complexity class related to Arthur–Merlin protocol
 Adrenomedullin, a protein
 Air mass (astronomy), measure of the amount of air along the line of sight in astronomical observations
 Am, tropical monsoon climate in the Köppen climate classification
 Americium, symbol Am, a chemical element
 Attometre, a unit of length
 attomolar (aM), a unit of molar concentration

Technology
 .am, Internet domain for Armenia
 .am, a file extension associated with Automake software
 AM broadcasting, radio broadcasting using amplitude modulation
 Additive manufacturing, or 3-D printing, a process of making a three-dimensional solid object of virtually any shape from a digital model.
 Agile modeling, a software engineering methodology for modeling and documenting software systems
 Amplitude modulation, an electronic communication technique
 Automated Mathematician, an artificial intelligence program

Timekeeping
 anno martyrum, a method of numbering years in the Coptic calendar
 Anno Mundi, a calendar era based on the biblical creation of the world
 ante meridiem, Latin for "before midday", written e.g. 6a.m.

Transportation
 A.M. (automobile), a 1906 French car
 Aeroméxico (IATA airline code AM), airline in Mexico
 All-mountain, a discipline of mountain biking
 Arkansas and Missouri Railroad

Other uses
 Am (cuneiform), a written syllable
 Member of the Order of Australia, postnominal letters which can be used by a Member of the Order
 Assembly Member (disambiguation), a political office
 Member of the National Assembly for Wales
 Member of the London Assembly
 Amharic language (ISO 639-1 language code am)
 Armenia (ISO country code AM)
 Attacking midfielder, a position in association football
 The Book of Amos, part of the Tanakh and Old Testament
First-person singular present of the copula verb to be

See also 

 
 
 
 Pro–am
 `am (disambiguation)
 A&M (disambiguation)
 AM2 (disambiguation)
 AMS (disambiguation)